Dobroslav (formerly Kominternivske) is an urban-type settlement in Odesa Oblast in Ukraine. It was the administrative center of Lyman Raion and is currently in Odesa Raion. Population: 

On 21 May 2016, Verkhovna Rada adopted decision to rename Kominternivske Raion to Lyman Raion  and Kominternivske to Dobroslav according to the law prohibiting names of Communist origin.

Dobroslav is located on the banks of the Small Adzhalyk River, which forms the Small Adzhalyk Estuary.

Economy

Transportation
The closest railway station is in Kremydivka, on a railway which connects Odesa with Mykolaiv and Voznesensk.

Dobroslav has access to Highway M14 connecting Odesa and Mykolaiv. Local roads connect it to Berezivka and Ivanivka.

References

Urban-type settlements in Odesa Raion